Kent Marcum is an American composer and pianist. He studied at Interlochen Arts Academy, North Texas State University, and did graduate work at Eastern Michigan University. Some of his music has been used on The Weather Channel such as "Midnight Air", "Playtime" and "The First Star That I See Tonight". He has placed 20 compositions with Harpo Productions and has placed musical compositions with other libraries, including MTV.

Discography
Moments Like These (1999)
Reflections on Christmas (2000)
The Journey (2004)
Playtime (2005)
The Twelve Songs of Christmas (2007)

Notes

External links
Official website

American male composers
20th-century American composers
Composers for piano
Musicians from Michigan
University of North Texas College of Music alumni
New-age pianists
Living people
Eastern Michigan University alumni
20th-century American pianists
American male pianists
21st-century American pianists
20th-century American male musicians
21st-century American male musicians
Year of birth missing (living people)